is a science fiction manga by Moto Hagio. It is set in a near-future Japan, and begins with a girl, Jyujo Aoba, who has been in a coma since she was nine years old, who was discovered next to her parents' bodies, with their hearts inside her stomach. To discover why she killed her parents, a specialist enters her coma dreams and finds that Jyujo is dreaming about and simultaneously creating the future. The series was serialised in Shogakukan's Flowers between September 2002 and August 2005 and is collected in 4 volumes. The series is licensed for release in the United States by Fantagraphics Books.

In 2006, Otherworld Barbara won the Grand Prize of the 27th Nihon SF Taisho Award

Development
Hagio "wanted to do something about meat" when she created the story for Otherworld Barbara, and felt that the story "turned out kind of gross". Thorn felt that Hagio also used her interest in the right and left brain, and the origin of language. She read Noam Chomsky's Noam Chomsky on The Generative Enterprise, A discussion with Riny Hyybregts and Henk van Riemsdijk., Vilayanur S. Ramachandran's Phantoms in the Brain: Probing the Mysteries of the Human Mind, and Andrew B. Newberg's Why God Won’t Go Away: Brain Science and the Biology of Belief.

Volume list

Reception
Otherworld Barbara won the Grand Prize of the 27th Nihon SF Taisho Award by the Science Fiction and Fantasy Writers of Japan (SFWJ) in 2006 and was the first manga in 23 years to have won this award. Paste Magazine praised Hagio's sense of pacing.

References

External links
Official site (flash required) 

Josei manga
Moto Hagio
Science fiction anime and manga
Sharp Point Press titles
Shogakukan manga
Fantagraphics titles